WPOK may refer to:

 1080 WPOK (AM) Pontiac, Illinois: a defunct radio station (FCC facility ID 37822) on the air from 1966 to 1998
 103.1 WPOK-FM Pontiac, Illinois: a radio station (FCC facility ID 37818) which has become 93.7 WJBC-FM

See also
 :Wikipedia:WikiProject Oklahoma